SAVAK (abbreviation for  Sâzemân-e Ettelâ'ât va Amniat-e Kešvar) was the secret police, domestic security and intelligence service in Iran during the reign of the Pahlavi dynasty. SAVAK operated from 1957 until prime minister Shapour Bakhtiar ordered its dissolution during the climax of the 1979 Iranian Revolution.

SAVAK had 5,000 agents at its peak. Gholam Reza Afkhami estimates SAVAK staffing at between 4,000 and 6,000. Time magazine's 19 February 1979 publication also states that it had 5,000 members.

History

1957–1971 
After the 1953 Iranian coup d'état, the United States and the United Kingdom removed Mohammad Mosaddeq, who was originally focused on nationalizing Iran's oil industry, but also set out to weaken the Shah from power on August 19, 1953. After the coup, the monarch, Mohammad Reza Shah, established an intelligence service with police powers. The Shah's goal was to strengthen his regime by placing political opponents under surveillance and repressing dissident movements. According to Encyclopædia Iranica:

In March 1955, the Army colonel was "replaced with a more permanent team of five career CIA officers, including specialists in covert operations, intelligence analysis, and counterintelligence, including Major General Herbert Norman Schwarzkopf who "trained virtually all of the first generation of SAVAK personnel." In 1956, this agency was reorganized and given the name Sazeman-e Ettela'at va Amniyat-e Keshvar (SAVAK). These in turn were replaced by SAVAK's own instructors in 1965.

SAVAK had the power to censor the media, screen applicants for government jobs, and "according to reliable Western source, use all means necessary, including torture, to hunt down dissidents". After 1963, the Shah expanded his security organizations, including SAVAK, which grew to over 5,300 full-time agents and a large but unknown number of part-time informers.

In 1961 the Iranian authorities dismissed the agency's first director, General Teymur Bakhtiar, and he later became a political dissident. In 1970, SAVAK agents assassinated him, disguising the deed as an accident.

General Hassan Pakravan, director of SAVAK from 1961 to 1966, had an almost benevolent reputation, for example dining on a weekly basis with Ayatollah Khomeini while Khomeini was under house arrest, and later intervened to prevent Khomeini's execution on the grounds that it would "anger the common people of Iran". After the Iranian Revolution, however, Pakravan was among the first of the Shah's officials to be executed by the Khomeini regime.

Pakravan was replaced in 1966 by General Nematollah Nassiri, a close associate of the Shah, and the service was reorganized and became increasingly active in the face of rising leftist and Islamist militancy and political unrest.

Siahkal attack and after
A turning point in SAVAK's reputation for ruthless brutality was reportedly an attack on a gendarmerie post in the Caspian village of Siahkal by a small band of armed Marxists in February 1971, although it is also reported to have tortured to death a Shia cleric, Ayatollah Muhammad Reza Sa'idi, in 1970. According to Iranian political historian Ervand Abrahamian, after this attack SAVAK interrogators were sent abroad for "scientific training to prevent unwanted deaths from 'brute force.' Brute force was supplemented with the bastinado; sleep deprivation; extensive solitary confinement; glaring searchlights; standing in one place for hours on end; nail extractions; snakes (favored for use with women); electrical shocks with cattle prods, often into the rectum; cigarette burns; sitting on hot grills; acid dripped into nostrils; near-drownings; mock executions; and an electric chair with a large metal mask to muffle screams while amplifying them for the victim. This latter contraption was dubbed the Apollo—an allusion to the American space capsules. Prisoners were also humiliated by being raped, urinated on, and forced to stand naked. Despite the new 'scientific' methods, the torture of choice remained the traditional bastinado used to beat soles of the feet.  The "primary goal" of those using the bastinados "was to locate arms caches, safe houses and accomplices ..."

Abrahamian estimates that SAVAK (and other police and military) killed 368 guerrillas including the leadership of the major urban guerrilla organizations (Organization of Iranian People's Fedai Guerrillas, People's Mujahedin of Iran) such as Hamid Ashraf between 1971–1977 and executed up to 100 political prisoners between 1971 and 1979—the most violent era of the SAVAK's existence.

The repression was softened thanks to publicity and scrutiny by "numerous international organizations and foreign newspapers." Jimmy Carter became President of the United States and he raised the issue of human rights in the Imperial State of Iran. Overnight prison conditions changed. Inmates dubbed this the dawn of "jimmykrasy".

Directors

Number of employees 
Over the years, the question of the number of employees of SAVAK has been the subject of debate by many historians and researchers. Given the fact that Iran has never disclosed data on the number of employees of the secret agency - many historians gave conflicting figures for the number of SAVAK personnel - 6,000, 20,000, 30,000 and 60,000.

In one of his interviews, on February 4, 1974, the Shah stated that he did not know the exact number of employees of SAVAK. However, he estimated their total number to be less than 2,000 employees. To the frequently asked question about “torture and atrocities” in SAVAK, the shah answered negatively, designating newspaper reports about the “arbitrariness and cruelty of SAVAK” as a lie and slander. Leaflets circulated after the Islamic Revolution indicated that 15,000 Iranians officially served in SAVAK, not to mention the many unofficial employees.

Operations 
During the height of its power, SAVAK had virtually unlimited powers. It operated its own detention centers, such as Evin Prison.  In addition to domestic security, the service's tasks extended to the surveillance of Iranians abroad, notably in the United States, France, and the United Kingdom, and especially students on government stipends. The agency also closely collaborated with the CIA by sending their agents to an air force base in New York to share and discuss interrogation tactics.

Teymur Bakhtiar was assassinated by SAVAK agents in 1970, and Mansur Rafizadeh, SAVAK's United States director during the 1970s, reported that General Nassiri's phone was tapped. Mansur Rafizadeh later wrote of his life as a SAVAK man and detailed the human rights violations of the Shah in his book Witness: From the Shah to the Secret Arms Deal: An Insider's Account of U.S. Involvement in Iran. Mansur Rafizadeh was suspected to have been a double agent also working for the CIA.

According to Polish author Ryszard Kapuściński, SAVAK was responsible for
 Censorship of press, books and films.
 Interrogation and often torture of prisoners
 Surveillance of political opponents.

Victims
Writing at the time of the Shah's overthrow, Time magazine on February 19, 1979, described SAVAK as having "long been Iran's most hated and feared institution" which had "tortured and murdered thousands of the Shah's opponents." The Federation of American Scientists also found it guilty of "the torture and execution of thousands of political prisoners" and symbolizing "the Shah's rule from 1963–79." The FAS list of SAVAK torture methods included "electric shock, whipping, beating, inserting broken glass and pouring boiling water into the rectum, tying weights to the testicles, and the extraction of teeth and nails."

Fardoust and security and intelligence after the revolution 

SAVAK was closed down shortly before the overthrow of the monarchy and the coming to power of Ayatollah Ruhollah Khomeini in the February 1979 Iranian Revolution. Following the departure of the Shah in January 1979, SAVAK's more 3,000 strong central staff and its agents were targeted for reprisals. However, it is believed that Khomeini may have changed his mind and may have retained them into the new SAVAMA. Hossein Fardoust, a former classmate of the Shah, was a deputy director of SAVAK until he was appointed head of the Imperial Inspectorate, also known as the Special Intelligence Bureau, to watch over high-level government officials, including SAVAK directors. Fardoust later switched sides during the revolution and managed to salvage the bulk of the SAVAK organization. According to author Charles Kurzman, SAVAK was never dismantled but rather changed its name and leadership and continued on with the same codes of operation, and a relatively unchanged "staff."

SAVAK was replaced by the "much larger" SAVAMA, Sazman-e Ettela'at va Amniat-e Melli-e Iran, also known as the Ministry of Intelligence and National Security of Iran. After the Iranian Revolution, a museum was opened in the former Towhid Prison in central Tehran called "Ebrat". The museum displays and exhibits the documented atrocities of SAVAK.

See also

Second Bureau of Imperial Iranian Army
Prime Ministry Intelligence Office
Ministry of Intelligence (Iran)

References

External links

Ministry of Intelligence and Security VEVAK – Iran Intelligence Agencies at website of Federation of American Scientists

 
Defunct Iranian intelligence agencies
Mohammad Reza Pahlavi
Government agencies established in 1957
Human rights abuses in Iran
Political repression in Iran
Organisations of the Iranian Revolution
1957 establishments in Iran
1979 disestablishments in Iran